Norwegian county road 415 (Fv415) is a Norwegian county road in Agder county, Norway. The Norwegian County Road 412 splits off from this road to connect to Nelaug and the Nelaug Station. The Norwegian County Road 414 connects to this road at Ubergsmoen and heads north into Vegårshei.

References

Åmli
Tvedestrand
415
Road transport in Agder